Lou Dickenson (born 15 August 1982) is a Canadian professional ice hockey player who last played for the Thetford Assurancia of the Ligue Nord-Américaine de Hockey. He was selected by the Edmonton Oilers in the fourth round (113th overall) of the 2000 NHL Entry Draft.

Early on in his junior career, he was labeled as a potential first round draft pick for the 2000 Draft, due to his combination of speed, size and skill.  Unfortunately, being on dismal Mississauga IceDogs teams hindered his development, and he fell to the 4th round, drafted by the Edmonton Oilers. Dickenson played in the American Hockey League with the San Antonio Rampage before embarking on a European career.

On July 15, 2015, having left Herning Blue Fox of the Danish Metal Ligaen, Dickenson agreed to a contract with Scottish club, the Dundee Stars of the EIHL after securing a placement to study at the University of Dundee.

In 2017, Dickenson co-founded a hockey training program in Ottawa named Lou Dickenson Elite Performance Hockey which offers one on one coaching for hockey players.

Personal life
In 2011, Dickenson married Swedish-born Alexandra and they had two children together in Europe before moving back to Canada in 2016.

Career statistics

References

External links

1982 births
Living people
AaB Ishockey players
Alumni of the University of Dundee
Dundee Stars players
Edinburgh Capitals players
Edmonton Oilers draft picks
Ice hockey people from Ottawa
Guelph Storm players
Gwinnett Gladiators players
HDD Olimpija Ljubljana players
Herning Blue Fox players
Hershey Bears players
Kingston Frontenacs players
KooKoo players
Lahti Pelicans players
Laredo Bucks players
London Knights players
Manitoba Moose players
Mississauga IceDogs players
Ottawa 67's players
Rosenborg IHK players
San Antonio Rampage players
Stjernen Hockey players
SV Kaltern players
Texas Wildcatters players
Thetford Assurancia players
Vaasan Sport players
HC Valpellice players
Canadian ice hockey forwards
Canadian expatriate ice hockey players in Sweden
Canadian expatriate ice hockey players in Scotland
Canadian expatriate ice hockey players in the United States
Canadian expatriate ice hockey players in Slovenia
Canadian expatriate ice hockey players in Denmark
Canadian expatriate ice hockey players in Finland
Canadian expatriate ice hockey players in Norway
Canadian expatriate ice hockey players in Italy